Dave Simmonds is a male former boxer who competed for England.

Boxing career
Simmonds won the 1970 Amateur Boxing Association British light-middleweight title, when boxing out of the Gloucester ABC.

He represented England in the 71 kg light-middleweight division, at the 1970 British Commonwealth Games in Edinburgh, Scotland.

He turned professional and fought in 4 fights from 1974 until 1980.

References

English male boxers
Boxers at the 1970 British Commonwealth Games
Light-middleweight boxers
Commonwealth Games competitors for England